Caecilia Metella was daughter of Quintus Caecilius Metellus Celer and Clodia. She was an infamous woman in Rome during the late Republic and a celebrity of sorts.

Biography

Early life
She was the daughter of the consul Quintus Caecilius Metellus Celer, while her mother Clodia was a notorious adulterer and possibly the inspiration for the figure of Lesbia in poetry. Caecilia seems to have taken after her mother.

Marriage and scandals
In 53 BC, Metella Celer was married to Publius Cornelius Lentulus Spinther, a conservative politician, allied to her father's family. Like her mother, Metella did not content herself with a simple married life. Briefly after the wedding she started an affair with Publius Cornelius Dolabella, a man of the opposite political spectrum. Spinther divorced her in 45 BC in the midst of a huge scandal. Cicero bitterly discusses the affair in his letters, because at the time, his daughter Tullia was Dolabella's wife. 

Metella went back to her family in absolute disgrace. She was still in her twenties and very beautiful. Her cousins did not hesitate in using her for political conspiracies. Metella seduced several of Julius Caesar's intimate friends, in order to get the family name cleared after the defeat of the Optimates in the battles of Pharsalus and Munda. Amongst her non-political lovers is the poet Ticida, who wrote about Metella, giving her the name of "Perilla". Her last known lover was one Aesopo, a wealthy member of the equites, who supported the Caecilii Metelli for a few years. Her date of death is unknown.

See also 
List of Roman women
Women in ancient Rome
Caecilii Metelli family tree

Notes

References
 

Caecilii Metelli
1st-century BC Roman women
1st-century BC Romans